ECU Health Duplin Hospital is a hospital located in Kenansville, North Carolina. It is affiliated with the ECU Health Medical Center & ECU Health in Greenville, NC.

History
The hospital opened in 1955 and added a nine-bed intensive care unit in the 1970s. The hospital added  in 1989.

Services
Duplin General Hospital has 61 general and 20 psychiatric hospital beds.  It has 20 general nursing home beds and three Shared Inpatient/Ambulatory Surgery operating rooms.

References

External links 
 Vidant Duplin Hospital

Hospital buildings completed in 1955
Hospitals in North Carolina
Buildings and structures in Duplin County, North Carolina
1955 establishments in North Carolina